Grover is a Muppet character on the children's television show Sesame Street.

Grover may also refer to:

People
 Grover (surname), found in India and the West
 Grover (given name)

Place names

United States
 Grover, Colorado, town
 Grover, Kansas, unincorporated community
 Grover, Minnesota, abandoned town
 Grover, Nebraska, unincorporated community
 Grover, North Carolina, town
 Grover, South Carolina, unincorporated community
 Grover, South Dakota, unincorporated community
 Grover, Utah, unincorporated community
 Grover, Wisconsin (disambiguation), several places
 Grover, Wyoming, a census designated place
 Grover Beach, California
 Grovertown, Indiana, unincorporated community

Other uses
 GROVER, 2013 rover prototype of NASA used for Earth-bound projects
 Grover's algorithm, quantum search of an unsorted database invented by Lov Grover
 Grover's disease, common skin disease
 Grover Musical Products, Inc., manufacturer of accessories for guitars, banjos and other stringed instruments

See also
 Grover's Mill, New Jersey, part of West Windsor Township, New Jersey, and site of the fictitious Martian landing of Orson Welles's 1938 War of the Worlds radio program
 Grover Shoe Factory disaster, 1905 boiler explosion and fire that killed 58
 Our Town, play by Thornton Wilder set in the fictional town of Grover's Corners